German submarine U-451 was a Type VIIC U-boat in the service of Nazi Germany's Kriegsmarine during World War II.

Commissioned on 3 May 1941, with Korvettenkapitän Eberhard Hoffmann in command, she was assigned from then until 1 July to the 3rd U-boat Flotilla for training, and from 1 July 1941 until 21 December, she remained with the 3rd flotilla for operations.

She carried out four patrols before being lost in action.

Design
German Type VIIC submarines were preceded by the shorter Type VIIB submarines. U-451 had a displacement of  when at the surface and  while submerged. She had two shafts and two  propellers.

U-451 was fitted with five  torpedo tubes (four fitted at the bow and one at the stern), fourteen torpedoes, one  SK C/35 naval gun, 220 rounds, and a  C/30 anti-aircraft gun. The boat had a complement of between forty-four and sixty.

Service history
The boat set-off from Kiel and moved into Norwegian waters between 23 June and 24 July 1941.

First and second patrols
She departed Kirkenes in the far north on 30 July 1941, patrolled the Barents Sea and sank one warship of 550 tons, the Soviet corvette Zhemchug (No 27), on 10 August. She returned to Kirkenes on 12 August.

Her second patrol, between 19 August and 12 September 1941, lasted 25 days. She then returned to Kiel.

Third and fourth patrols
Starting from Kiel on 25 November 1941, she sailed to Lorient in occupied France, arriving on 12 December.

Her fourth and final sortie began on 15 December 1941, taking her from Lorient, through the Bay of Biscay to a point in mid-Atlantic north of the Azores. She then turned toward the Mediterranean.

Loss
She was sunk off Tangier, Morocco, on the night of 21 December 1941 by a Fairey Swordfish Mk. I, V4431, flying with 812 Naval Air Squadron from RNAS North Front, Gibraltar. U-451 was first detected by Air-to-Surface Vessel radar (ASV) at a range of  miles and about 18 miles NW of Cape Spartel. "The Swordfish closed the contact and sighted the U-Boat on the surface steering to the eastward. Three depth charges were dropped ahead of the U-Boat and across her bows. The centre depth charge of the stick, set at 25 feet, exploded immediately under the U-Boat, which was not seen again. The details of the U-Boat's disappearance could not be observed as U 451 was enveloped in the spray of the depth-charge explosions. Two large oil patches were seen, each 300 yards in diameter." The sole surviving crew member, Oberleutnant zur See (Lieutenant) Walter Köhler, stated that he was on the bridge with three ratings at the time of the attack, and that the noise of the diesel engines obscured the sound of the attacking aircraft until the moment of weapons release. He was unable to get inside the vessel before the hatch was closed. "He stated that the U-boat then sank bows down. The prisoner flung himself into the water and swam for an hour and a half before he was picked up by Myosotis."

Summary of raiding history

References

Notes

Citations

Bibliography

External links

German Type VIIC submarines
U-boats commissioned in 1941
U-boats sunk by British aircraft
U-boats sunk by depth charges
U-boats sunk in 1941
World War II shipwrecks in the Atlantic Ocean
World War II submarines of Germany
1941 ships
Ships built in Kiel
Maritime incidents in December 1941